Letshego Microfinance Uganda, (also Letshego Microfinance Uganda Limited (LMUL)), whose official name is Letshego Uganda Limited, is a Tier IV microfinance institution in Uganda.

LMUL is a microfinance company that offers SME loans, mortgage loans, and education loans, among other forms of lending. The company also offers savings accounts.

As of December 2013, LMUL's assets were valued at UGX:91 billion (US$36.4 million) and it had a loan portfolio of UGX:58 billion ($23.2 million). Total customer deposits stood at UGX:43 billion ($17.2 million). At that time, the institution had 32 branches.

History
The institution was founded in 2005 as Micro Provident Uganda Limited. In 2012, the business re-branded to Letshego Uganda Limited. In 2013, Letshego Holdings Limited acquired control of Micro Africa Limited, a Kenya-based microfinance institution with subsidiaries in Kenya, Rwanda, Uganda, and South Sudan. The two operations in Uganda were merged to form Letshego Microfinance Uganda Limited.

Location
LMUL's headquarters are located at 9 Wampewo Avenue on Kololo Hill, a business and residential neighborhood within the city of Kampala, Uganda's capital. The coordinates of the institution's headquarters are 00°19'23.0"N, 32°35'47.0"E (Latitude:0.323056; Longitude:32.596389).

Ownership
The company is majority owned by Letshego Holdings Limited, a publicly traded holding company of financial services subsidiaries in Botswana, Burundi, Eswatini, Kenya, Lesotho, Mozambique, Namibia, Nigeria, Rwanda, Tanzania, and Uganda.

Branch network

The branch network of LMUL included the following locations as of August 2016.

 Kololo Branch - 9 Wampewo Avenue, Kololo, Kampala Head Office
 Arua Branch - 47 Adumi Road, Arua
 Apac Branch - Hospital Road, Apac
 Arua Park Branch - Shop 7&8, Arua Park Mall, Kampala
 Bundibugyo Branch - 2 Vanilla Street, Bundibugyo
 Bushenyi Branch - 9 High Street, Bushenyi
 Tororo Branch - 5-17 Nagongera Road, Tororo
 Gulu Branch - 13 Awere Road, Gulu
 Iganga Branch - 4B Obojja Road, Iganga
 Ibanda Branch - 12 Bufunda Road, Ibanda
 Jinja Branch 1 - 54 Iganga Road, Jinja
 Jinja Branch 2 - 51-53 Lubas Road, Jinja 
 Soroti Branch - 59B Gweri Road, Soroti
 Katwe Branch - Katwe Road, Katwe, Kampala
 Mbale Branch - BCU Building, 12 Manafwa Road, Mbale
 Kamuli Branch - 14 Gabula Kitimbo Road, Kamuli
 Kabwohe Branch - 67 Mbarara-Ishaka Road, Kabwohe 
 Kajjansi Branch - 383 Kampala-Entebbe Road, Kajjansi
 Kaleerwe Branch - 220 Kampala-Gayaza Road, Kaleerwe, Kampala
 Kanungu Branch - Independence Road, Kanungu
 Kasese Branch - Rwenzori Road, Kasese
 Kayunga Branch - Busaana Road, Kayunga
 Kibaale Branch - 1 Isuunga Road, Kibaale
 Kiboga Branch - Kampala-Hoima Road, Kiboga
 Kireka Branch - 336 Kampala-Jinja Road, Kireka
 Kisozi Complex Branch - 8 Kisozi Complex, Kyaggwe Road, Nakasero, Kampala
 Kisoro Branch - 30 Kabale Road, Kisoro
 Kitgum Branch - 107 Uhuru Drive, Kitgum
 Kotido Branch - 20 London Road, Kotido
 Kyotera Branch - 238 Bukoba Road, Kyotera
 Kumi Branch - 14 Oumo Road, Kumi
 Lira Branch - 114 Oyam Road, Lira
 Luweero Branch - 739 Kampala-Gulu Road, Luweero
 Masaka Branch - 16 Edward Street, Masaka
 Masindi Branch - 91 Masindi Port Road, Masindi
 Fort Portal Branch - 3 Rukidi III Street, Fort Portal
 Mayuge Branch - 11 Bugade Road, Mayuge
 Kapchorwa Branch 1 - 32A Kapchorwa-Mbale Road, Kapchorwa
 Kapchorwa Branch 2 -23 Gogonya Road, Kapchorwa
 Mbarara Branch - 16-18 Bananuka Drive, Mbarara
 Mityana Branch - 425 Mityana Road, Mityana
 Moroto Branch - Moroto-Napak Road, Moroto
 Moyo Branch - Laura House, Besia Village, Moyo
 Mpigi Branch - 195 Butambala Road, Mpigi
 Mukono Branch - 3 Kampala-Jinja Road, Mukono
 Nansana Branch - Masitowa Building, 5390 Kampala-Hoima Road, Nansana
 Nateete Branch - Marvin House, 962 Kampala-Masaka Road, Nateete
 Nebbi Branch - 19 Arua Road, Nebbi
 Ntungamo Branch - 8 Kabale Road
 Rukungiri Branch - 31 Rubabo Road, Rukungiri
 Kabale Branch - 88 Kisoro Road, Kabale
 Koboko Branch - Samuel Baba Road, Koboko

See also
 Banking in Uganda
 List of banks in Uganda

References

External links
 Website of Bank of Uganda

Banks of Uganda
Companies based in Kampala
Kampala Central Division
Banks established in 2005
2005 establishments in Uganda